Salem Al-Hamdan (born 5 May 1992) is a Saudi Arabian football player who currently plays as a left back.

References

External links
 

Living people
1992 births
Association football defenders
Saudi Arabian footballers
Al-Qadsiah FC players
Al-Hazem F.C. players
Al-Bukayriyah FC players
Al-Nojoom FC players
Al-Nahda Club (Saudi Arabia) players
Place of birth missing (living people)
Saudi First Division League players
Saudi Professional League players